Thomas Michael O'Leary (August 16, 1875 – October 10, 1949) is an American prelate of the Roman Catholic Church.  He served as the bishop of the Diocese of Springfield in Massachusetts from 1921 until his death in 1949.

Biography

Early life 
The third of seven children, Thomas O'Leary was born on August 16, 1875, in Dover, New Hampshire, to Michael and Margaret (née Howland) O'Leary. He attended elementary school and high school in Dover, graduating in 1887.  He then traveled to Ireland to attend Mungret College in Limerick, obtaining a Bachelor of Arts degree in 1892.  O'Leary went to Canada to study philosophy and theology at the Grand Seminary of Montreal in Montreal, Quebec.

Priesthood 
O'Leary was ordained to the priesthood in Montreal for the Diocese of Manchester by Bishop Maxime Decelles on December 18, 1897. After his ordination, O'Leary spent six months as assistant pastor at St. Ann's Parish in Manchester, New Hampshire from 1898 to 1899.  He was then sent to St. John's Parish in Concord, New Hampshire to serve as assistant pastor from 1899 to 1904.  O'Leary then spent three more years at St. John's as parish administrator.  O'Leary was named chancellor in 1904 and vicar general in 1914 of the diocese. He also served as chaplain to the Sisters of the Sacred Blood congregation and editor of the diocese newspaper Guidon.  According to author Kevin Donovan, O'Leary was considered to be rigid, unapproachable and distant by his fellow clergy, and they were not sorry to see him go to Springfield.

Bishop of Springfield in Massachusetts 
On June 16, 1921, O'Leary was appointed bishop of the Diocese of Springfield in Massachusetts by Pope Benedict XV. He received his episcopal consecration on September 8, 1921, from Archbishop Arthur Alfred Sinnott, with Bishops Michael Curley and George Guertin serving as co-consecrators. During his tenure, O'Leary introduced the Passionists and Sisters of Providence, expanded Mercy Hospital in Springfield and opened 24 new parishes.  

In 1928, O'Leary spearheaded the founding of Our Lady of the Elms College in Chicopee, Massachusetts, the first Catholic college for women in Western Massachusetts.  O'Leary served as its first president until his death in 1949.  He described the college's educational aims:... to speak convincingly, write gracefully, spend leisure time profitably, and assume responsibility easily." In 1943, during World War II,  O'Leary authorized the collection of clothing at parishes to be sent to war victims in the Soviet Union as part of the Russian War Relief effort.  He was one of only four Catholic bishops in the United States to participate in this drive.

Thomas O'Leary died in Springfield on October 10, 1949, at age 74. O'Leary Hall, a student residence at Elms College, is named after him.

References

1875 births
1949 deaths
People from Dover, New Hampshire
Roman Catholic Diocese of Manchester
20th-century Roman Catholic bishops in the United States
Religious leaders from New Hampshire
Roman Catholic bishops of Springfield in Massachusetts
Elms College faculty
Catholics from New Hampshire